Albania and France are members of the North Atlantic Treaty Organization (NATO) and the Organization for Security and Co-operation in Europe (OSCE).

History
During the Balkan Wars (1912-1913), Albanians declared the independence of Albania from the Ottoman Empire. France along with Russia opposed Albanian aims due to their support for Serbia, and both backed their Balkan allies' proposals for less territory and coast for the new borders of the Albanian state.

As a European Union (EU) founder and member, France was one of the only countries that did not support Albania in its euro-integration path, until March 30, 2020.

Resident diplomatic missions
 Albania has an embassy in Paris. 
 France has an embassy in Tirana.

See also 
 French in Albania
 Albanians in France
 Accession of Albania to the European Union

References

External links 
 Albanian Embassy in Paris 
 French Embassy in Tirana

 
France
Bilateral relations of France